Graham Jones (born 5 May 1963) is a former international speedway rider from England.

Speedway career 
Jones reached the final of the British Speedway Championship on three occasions in 1989, 1990 and 1992. He rode in the top tier of British Speedway from 1984 to 2004, riding for various clubs.

References 

Living people
1963 births
British speedway riders
Glasgow Tigers riders
Hull Vikings riders
Stoke Potters riders
Wolverhampton Wolves riders
Sportspeople from Oswestry